Siručiai Palace (or Sirutis house) is a late Baroque mansion in the Kaunas Old Town, which was built in 1742 by Kaunas city court foreman Simonas Sirutis and later was purchased by Jonas Mačiulis-Maironis in 1909. The building is currently used as a Maironis Lithuanian Literature Museum.

Stamps

References

External links 
 Maironis literature museum

Palaces in Kaunas